Daniel Rohrmeier (born September 27, 1965) is a former professional baseball first baseman.

Rohrmeier attended St. Thomas University, and in 1986 he played collegiate summer baseball with the Hyannis Mets of the Cape Cod Baseball League. He was selected by the Chicago White Sox in the 5th round of the 1987 Major League Baseball Draft. 

In his first professional season, he batted .329 as a third baseman for the High-A Peninsula White Sox. While in the Rangers organization, he played three seasons for Double-A Tulsa.

On February 23, 1992, Rohrmeier signed with the Kansas City Royals. Rohrmeier began playing for the Double-A Southern League's Memphis in 1992. Late in the 1994 season, while still playing for the Chicks under manager Ron Johnson, Rohrmeier was approaching Johnson's own single-season Southern League record for doubles. Rohrmeier was released on August 10 by the Royals because, according to the club, he had a physical and verbal altercation with Johnson stemming from his argument with an umpire. According to what The Cincinnati Post called "[o]thers in the Southern League," however, Rohrmeier was let go because he was closing in on Johnson's record. After making some calls, Rohrmeier was offered a roster spot with the Cincinnati Reds' Southern League affiliate within 24 hours of his release. He would end up setting a new Southern League single-season doubles record with 41.

He batted .297 with 33 home runs and 120 RBI and earned a September promotion to the majors, going 3 for 9. In , he again played for Triple-A Tacoma and again had a strong season, batting .286 with 25 home runs and 104 RBI.

In 1999, Rohrmeier signed with the Hanwha Eagles, a team in South Korea's KBO League. He and fellow American import Jay Davis, as well as Koreans Song Ji-man and Chang Jong-hoon, led the Eagles to the 1999 Korean Series championship; the team had a slugging percentage of .487, the highest team total in KBO League history. Rohrmeier contributed with 45 home runs and 109 RBI to go with a slash line of .292/.388/.643.

He played two seasons for the Eagles, then one season for the LG Twins, before retiring after the 2001 season.

References

External links

Career statistics and player information from Korea Baseball Organization

1965 births
Living people
Major League Baseball first basemen
Seattle Mariners players
Hanwha Eagles players
LG Twins players
Charlotte Rangers players
Tulsa Drillers players
Memphis Chicks players
Omaha Royals players
Chattanooga Lookouts players
Indianapolis Indians players
Tacoma Rainiers players
Fargo-Moorhead RedHawks players
Miami Dade Sharks baseball players
St. Thomas Bobcats baseball players
Hyannis Harbor Hawks players
KBO League infielders
American expatriate baseball players in South Korea
Brockton Rox players
Baseball players from Cincinnati
Elder High School alumni
Alaska Goldpanners of Fairbanks players